Cissy Kityo Mutuluuza  (née Cissy Kityo), is a Ugandan physician, epidemiologist and medical researcher. She is the Executive Director of the Joint Clinical Research Centre, a government-owned medical research institution in Uganda, specializing in HIV/AIDS treatment and management.

Background and education
Dr. Kityo hails from Mpigi District, in the Central Region of Uganda. She attended local Ugandan schools for her pre-university education. She studied at Makerere University School of Medicine, first graduating with a Bachelor of Medicine and Bachelor of Surgery (MBChB) degree. She followed that up with a Master of Medicine (MMed) degree, also from Makerere University. Later, she obtained a Master of Public Health (MPH) degree from the Johns Hopkins Bloomberg School of Public Health, in Baltimore, Maryland, in the United States.

Career
She has over 20 years experience in the field of HIV/AID diagnosis, treatment, prevention and research. Starting circa 1992, she is among the pioneers of Antiretroviral Therapy (ART) use in sub-Saharan Africa. She has been one of the proponents and movers of scaling up treatment in Uganda. She is part of the team that planned and wrote Uganda's first strategic plan for a national ARV policy and program to increase access to care and ARVs.

Dr. Kityo has served as Principal Researcher (PR), (Co-RP) or researcher in many clinical, epidemiological and operational trials of HIV treatment and related infections including tuberculosis. She has also been closely involved in the study of prevention of HIV transmission and in the preparation for HIV vaccines. She is particularly interested in clinical trials, ART implementation, evolution of HIV drug resistance, HIV reservoirs and in operational research.

She has served as a member of the "AIDS Task Force (ATF)" in Uganda and as the Chairperson of the "AIDS Clinical Care Subcommittee" of the ATF. Dr. Kityo has published widely in peer publications, and related books on the subject.

Other responsibilities
In her capacity as executive director of the JCRC, she is a member of the board of directors of the institution.

See also
 Moses Kamya
 Ministry of Defence and Veterans Affairs (Uganda)
 Uganda Ministry of Health
 Makerere University College of Health Sciences
 Ministry of Education and Sports (Uganda)

References

External links

 Website of the Joint Clinical Research Centre
 Mpigi district ranked among the best performing districts As of 29 December 2017.

Living people
1962 births
People from Mpigi District
Central Region, Uganda
Makerere University alumni
Ugandan epidemiologists
Johns Hopkins Bloomberg School of Public Health alumni
HIV/AIDS researchers
Ugandan public health doctors
Ganda people
21st-century Ugandan women scientists
21st-century Ugandan scientists
Women public health doctors
Women epidemiologists